Khtun is a rural locality (a selo) in Shikhikentsky Selsoviet, Suleyman-Stalsky District, Republic of Dagestan, Russia. The population was 139 as of 2010.

Geography 
Khtun is located 14 km south of Kasumkent (the district's administrative centre) by road. Butkent is the nearest rural locality.

References 

Rural localities in Suleyman-Stalsky District